Haava-Tsäpsi is a village in Võru Parish,  Võru County, Estonia.

References

External links 
 Classification of Estonian administrative units and settlements 2012v1

Villages in Võru County
Võru Parish